Balara (Maithili/Nepali: बलरा) is a municipality in Sarlahi District, a part of Madhesh Province in Nepal. It was formed in 2016 occupying current 12 sections (wards) from previous 9 former VDCs. It occupies an area of 48.55 km2 with a total population of 45,194.

Geography 
Balara Municipality is composed of Balaramal (Got Balara), Bhansar Tol, Lakshmipur, Okas, Jabdi, Jamuniya, Narharganj, Arnaha, Hatiyaul, Sedhwa, Sijuwa, Mirjapur, Sudama, Chatauna, Achalgadh, Baluwabhar, Gadahiya, Dumariya, Maath Tola and Kharaiya Tola.

Balara is located about 25 kilometers south-west of Malangwa. Balara is currently the fifth largest city in Sarlahi District (after Malangawa, Barhathwa, Hariwon and Lalbandi.

The Balara village merged with the Balara Municipality on April 9, 2017.

Demography 
At the time of the 2009 Nepal census it had a population of 52,995 people living in 8,153 households.

Maithili is the most spoken language in the Balara Municipality, with Hindi, Nepali and English understood by the city's educated residents.

Temples 
Sitala Mai Temple, Bajrangbali Temple (Hanuman Asthan) Ma Durga Mandir, Malika Baba Asthan Laxmipur, Gadhi Mai Mandir, Sunar Mai Mandir, Maharani Asthan 
are Hindu temples there.

Festivals
Major religious celebrations include the Hindu festivals Chaurchan, Deepawali and Vijayadashami, followed by Chhat pooja, celebrated six days after Deepawali . Holi, Deepawali and Chhat pooja are celebrated in a carnival-like atmosphere.

References

External links
UN map of the municipalities of Sarlahi  District

Populated places in Sarlahi District
Nepal municipalities established in 2017
Municipalities in Madhesh Province